Central University of Gujarat is a public central university in Gandhinagar, Gujarat offering courses at undergraduate, postgraduate, and doctoral levels.

The university includes 16 schools, 14 academic departments, and 2 other special centres.

Organization & Governance 
The Central University of Gujarat has eleven schools  in different disciplines with various centres within them, at one special Centre.

Schools & Centres 
The university has 11 specialized schools imparting education in various fields. Some schools have further specialized centres within them.
 School of Applied Material Science (SAMS)
 School of Chemical Sciences (SCS)
 School of Education (SE)
 Centre for Studies in Research and Education(CSRE)
 School of Environment and Sustainable Development (SESD)
 School of International Studies (SIS)
Politics & International Relations (School level) (PIR)  Established in 2012, the PIR-SIS offers postgraduate course in Politics & International Relations.
Centre for International Politics (CIP)  The CIP offers doctoral programme in International politics.
 School of Language, Literature and Culture Studies (SLLCS)
Centre for German Studies (CGS)  The CGS-SLLCS offers undergraduate, postgraduate, and doctoral courses in German language, people, and culture.
Centre for Comparative Literature and Translation Studies (CCLTS)
Centre for English Studies (CES)
Centre for Hindi Language & Literature (CHLL)
Centre for Gujarati Language & Literature (CGLL)
Centre for Chinese Studies (CCS)
 School of Library & Information Sciences (SLIS)
 School of Life Sciences (SLS)
 School of Nano Sciences (SNS)
 School of National Security Studies (SNSS)
 School of Social Sciences (SSS)

Special Centre 
The university also has a special centre for Diaspora studies.
 Special Centre for Diaspora Studies

2009 Bill
The Central Universities Bill 2009 aims at creating one new central university each in Bihar, Gujarat, Haryana, Himachal Pradesh, Jammu and Kashmir, Jharkhand, Karnataka, Kerala, Odisha, Punjab, Rajasthan and Tamil Nadu.

It also seeks to convert Guru Ghasidas Vishwavidyalaya in Chhattisgarh, Harisingh Gour Vishwavidyalaya in Sagar (Madhya Pradesh), Utkal University in Bhubaneswar, Odisha and Hemwati Nandan Bahuguna Garhwal University in Uttarakhand into Central universities.

See also
 Central University, India
 School of Library and Information Science

References

External links
 Central University of Gujarat - Official website

Educational institutions established in 2009
Central universities in India
Universities in Gujarat
Education in Gandhinagar
2009 establishments in Gujarat